This is a list of amphibians and reptiles found on the island of Saint Martin, located in the Lesser Antilles chain in the Caribbean.  Politically, Saint Martin is divided between the Collectivity of Saint Martin on the northern half of the island, which is an overseas collectivity of France, and Sint Maarten on the southern half, which is part of the Netherlands Antilles.

Amphibians
There are three species of amphibian on Saint Martin, two of which were introduced.

Frogs (Anura)

Reptiles
Including marine turtles and introduced species, there are 17 reptile species reported on Saint Martin.  One species, the Bearded Anole (Anolis pogus), is endemic to Saint Martin.  Its local population of one species, the regionally endemic and endangered Lesser Antillean Iguana (Iguana delicatissima), was recently extirpated.

Turtles (Testudines)

Lizards and snakes (Squamata)

Notes

References
Note: All species listed above are supported by Malhotra & Thorpe 1999, unless otherwise cited.

.

 Amphibians
.
Saint Martin
 Saint Martin
 Saint Martin
Saint Martin
Saint Martin
Saint Martin